Thomas Oliver Gwaltney III (February 28, 1921, in Norfolk, Virginia, United States – February 11, 2003, in Virginia Beach, Virginia) was an American jazz multi-instrumentalist and bandleader. He played clarinet, saxophone, and vibraphone.

Biography
Gwaltney studied under Ernie Caceres and Peanuts Hucko, playing clarinet in college bands and while serving in the military. Due to lung injuries during World War II, he put down the clarinet and played vibraphone in the 1940s. From 1946 to 1947, he studied at New York University and played in an ensemble with Charlie Byrd and Sol Yaged. Between 1951 and 1955 he seldom played, concentrating on helping a family business in Norfolk, Virginia. In 1956, he joined Bobby Hackett, playing on his album Gotham Jazz Scene in 1957. He then worked with Wild Bill Davison, Billy Butterfield (1958–59), Buck Clayton (1960), Charlie Byrd again (1962–63), and with his own ensembles.

Gwaltney established the nightclub Blues Alley in Washington, D.C. After selling it, he still performed there regularly guitarist Steve Jordan. He organized the Virginia Beach Jazz Festival and the Manassas Jazz Festival; he led bands at Manassas with Davison, Ed Polcer, Willie "The Lion" Smith, Eddie Condon, Doc Evans, Bobby Hackett, Vic Dickenson, Maxine Sullivan, and Jimmy McPartland.

He stopped playing vibraphone in the 1970s but continued on clarinet in the 1980s and 1990s. In 1986 he recorded a tribute album for Pee Wee Russell and gave a concert at the Smithsonian Institution honoring Jimmie Noone. He worked in the Chesapeake Bay Jazz Band beginning in 1992.

Awards
 Best Reissue Album, Satchmo at the National Press Club: Red Beans and Rice-ly Yours, Independent Music Awards, 2013

Discography

As leader
 1960 Goin' to Kansas City with Buck Clayton (Riverside) 
 1963 Great Jazz (Laurel)
 1982 Singin' the Blues

As sideman
With Charlie Byrd
 1963 Once More! Charlie Byrd's Bossa Nova (Riverside) 
 1963 Bossa Nova Pelos Passaros

With Wild Bill Davison
 1966 Wild Bill at Bull Run
 1972  'S Wonderful
 1973 Just a Gig
 1986 Lady of the Evening

With others
 1957 Gotham Jazz Scene, Bobby Hackett (Capitol)
 1961 Wild Women Don't Have the Blues, Nancy Harrow (Candid)
 1968 Jazz as It Should Be Played, Eddie Condon
 1975 Manassas Memories '73, Doc Evans
 1976 Two for Tea, Max Kaminsky
 2008 Wille "The Lion Smith" and His Jazz Cubs, Willie "The Lion" Smith (Jazzology)
 2012 Satchmo at the National Press Club: Red Beans & Rice-Ly Yours, Louis Armstrong (Smithsonian Folkways)

References

Other sources
Barry Kernfeld, "Tommy Gwaltney". Grove Jazz online.

1921 births
2003 deaths
20th-century American saxophonists
American jazz bandleaders
American jazz clarinetists
American jazz saxophonists
American male saxophonists
American jazz vibraphonists
Jazz musicians from Virginia
20th-century American male musicians
American male jazz musicians
American military personnel of World War II